In the last episode of season 8, Zietlow and Hartwich confirmed that the show will return for its 9th season in 2015.
The contestants were announced in early January 2015. The season started off with a special on 16 January. While the first five contestants moved into the camp on 15 January, the six other campers stayed in a pre-camp on an island for a night and joined the other contestants on 16 January.

Contestants

Results and elimination

 Indicates that the celebrity received the most votes from the public
 Indicates that the celebrity received the fewest votes and was eliminated immediately (no bottom two)
 Indicates that the celebrity was in the bottom two of the public vote

Trials (Dschungelprüfungen)

Statistics 
Walter Freiwald, Jörn Schlönvoigt, Tanja Tischewitsch and Maren Gilzer completed the most trials (4). Patricia Blanco was the season's only contestant to not attended a trial. The contestants won 69 of 149 possible stars – more precisely: 68 and 1/2 stars. This is a percentage of 46%.

Ratings

References

2015 German television seasons
09